Brompton Ralph is a village and civil parish in the Somerset West and Taunton district of Somerset, England, about  west of Taunton, and  north of Wiveliscombe. It is in a wooded district at the eastern extremity of the Brendon Hills. According to the 2002 population estimates it had a population of 287.

History

The name Brompton, or Brunanton as it was called in the 8th century, is probably a corruption of Brendon, meaning the farmhouse by the Brendons.

Within the parish are vestiges of an encampment believed to have been constructed by the Romans.

The parish of Brompton Ralph was part of the Williton and Freemanners Hundred.

The manor farmhouse, which is Grade II* listed, dates from the mid 17th century.

Governance

The parish council has responsibility for local issues, including setting an annual precept (local rate) to cover the council's operating costs and producing annual accounts for public scrutiny. The parish council evaluates local planning applications and works with the local police, district council officers, and neighbourhood watch groups on matters of crime, security, and traffic. The parish council's role also includes initiating projects for the maintenance and repair of parish facilities, as well as consulting with the district council on the maintenance, repair, and improvement of highways, drainage, footpaths, public transport, and street cleaning. Conservation matters (including trees and listed buildings) and environmental issues are also the responsibility of the council.

The village falls within the non-metropolitan district of Somerset West and Taunton, which was established on 1 April 2019. It was previously in the district of West Somerset, which was formed on 1 April 1974 under the Local Government Act 1972, and part of Williton Rural District before that. The district council is responsible for local planning and building control, local roads, council housing, environmental health, markets and fairs, refuse collection and recycling, cemeteries and crematoria, leisure services, parks, and tourism.

Somerset County Council is responsible for running the largest and most expensive local services such as education, social services, libraries, main roads, public transport, policing and fire services, trading standards, waste disposal and strategic planning.

It is also part of the Bridgwater and West Somerset county constituency represented in the House of Commons of the Parliament of the United Kingdom. It elects one Member of Parliament (MP) by the first past the post system of election, and was part of the South West England constituency of the European Parliament prior to Britain leaving the European Union in January 2020, which elected seven MEPs using the d'Hondt method of party-list proportional representation.

Religious sites

St Mary's Church has a 15th-century tower and south door. The nave was refenestrated and the vestry added in the 16th century, and the church was partly rebuilt about 1740. It has been designated by English Heritage as a Grade II* listed building. Due to damage caused by leaking roofs it has been added to the Heritage at Risk Register.

References

Villages in West Somerset
Civil parishes in Somerset